GC-C may refer to:
 Guanylyl cyclase C, an enzyme
 Prodelphinidin B3 (Gallocatechin 4→8 catechin dimer), a condensed tannin